Erkhirik (Erkhereg) is a rural locality (a selo) in Zaigrayevsky District, Republic of Buryatia, Russia. The population was 2,261 as of 2010. There are 63 streets.

Geography 
Erkhirik is located 42 km northwest of Zaigrayevo (the district's administrative centre) by road. Dabata is the nearest rural locality.

References 

Rural localities in Zaigrayevsky District